Pärsi is a village in Mulgi Parish, Viljandi County in southern Estonia. It borders the villages Morna, Oti, Karksi, Polli and Allaste as well as other villages in the former Halliste Parish.

References

Villages in Viljandi County